Gereh Govabar (also Romanized as Gereh Govābar) is a village in Eshkevar-e Sofla Rural District, Rahimabad District, Rudsar County, Gilan Province, Iran. At the 2006 census, its population was 322, in 91 families.

References 

Populated places in Rudsar County